Killer Joe is a 2011 American Southern Gothic black comedy crime psychological thriller directed by William Friedkin. The screenplay by Tracy Letts is based on his 1993 play of the same name. The film stars Matthew McConaughey in the title role, Emile Hirsch, Juno Temple, Gina Gershon and Thomas Haden Church. Friedkin and Letts had also collaborated on the 2006 film Bug.

Plot
In West Dallas, Texas, 22-year-old drug dealer Chris Smith comes to the trailer park home of his dimwitted father Ansel and his cheating step-mother Sharla after his mother Adele, Ansel's ex-wife, threw Chris out of her house. To make matters worse, Adele stole his drugs he was supposed to sell and now owes the dealer money; now he (Chris) is desperate to pay off a $6,000 debt to his connection, Digger Soames. Chris tells Ansel that by killing Adele, they can collect on a $50,000 life insurance policy, of which Chris's sister Dottie is the sole beneficiary. Chris and Ansel agree that after paying a hit man from the proceeds of the insurance policy, they will split the remainder four ways between themselves, Dottie, and Sharla. Dottie approves of the plan and Chris arranges a meeting with Joe Cooper, a police detective who has a side career as a contract killer. Before the meeting, Dottie tells Joe that Adele tried to kill her once when she was an infant.

Since Chris and Ansel are broke, the plan almost falls apart when Joe demands $25,000 in advance. However, Joe is interested in young Dottie,  an 18-year-old, and offers to take her as a "retainer" until the insurance money comes through. Joe seduces Dottie and they start a relationship. Digger has his goons beat Chris, injuring him badly, and threatens to have him killed unless he pays what he owes. Chris has a change of heart and asks Joe to call off the hit and stop seeing Dottie, only to discover that he has already killed Adele. With Chris' reluctant help, Joe hides the body in a car and torches it.

After Adele's death, the family learns that the insurance beneficiary is actually Rex, Adele's boyfriend, rather than Dottie. Chris then admits he originally heard the details about the policy from Rex, who also told him about Joe, thereby duping Chris into hiring Joe to kill Adele. Ansel blames Chris for the fiasco and tells him he should just kill himself. Chris tries to persuade Dottie to run away with him to escape Digger and Joe, both of whom expect to be paid. Dottie agrees to go with Chris if she can see Joe first.

After Adele's funeral, Joe pulls Rex over in his car and Chris buys an illegal pistol. When Ansel and Sharla return home, they find Joe inside with Dottie. He comes out of her room and asks increasingly pointed questions of Sharla, leading her to admit that she knew the policy was really for $100,000, since accidental death doubled the payout. Joe shows them a check of that amount payable to Rex, implying he is dead, as well as offering incriminating photos that prove Sharla was having an affair with Rex. Angered, Ansel declines to protect Sharla when Joe chokes her, punches her, and forces her to simulate oral sex on a fried chicken drumstick.

Joe knows Chris is coming to take Dottie away, and threatens to kill Ansel and Sharla if they don't stop him. After Chris arrives and is seated for dinner, Joe announces that he and Dottie will be married. Chris rejects this, ordering Dottie to leave with him. Joe tells her to stay where she is, but Dottie stands up and walks away as both men yell at her. When Chris threatens Joe with his gun, Sharla stabs Chris with a steak knife and Joe tackles him. Ansel and Sharla rush to assist Joe as he savagely beats Chris, not wanting to be killed if Chris flees with Dottie. Dottie recovers the gun and, in a rage, fires several shots, killing Chris and seriously wounding Ansel. Dottie turns the gun on Joe, telling him that she is pregnant. Joe appears overjoyed as he inches closer to Dottie. The film ends just as Dottie moves her finger to the trigger.

Cast
 Matthew McConaughey as Detective Joe 'Killer Joe' Cooper
 Emile Hirsch as Chris Smith
 Juno Temple as Dottie Smith
 Gina Gershon as Sharla Smith
 Thomas Haden Church as Ansel Smith
 Marc Macaulay as 'Digger' Soames

Rating controversy

In the United States, the film received an NC-17 rating from the MPAA for "graphic disturbing content involving violence and sexuality, and a scene of brutality." After an unsuccessful appeal, LD Entertainment announced plans to release the movie uncut, with the NC-17 rating, on July 27, 2012.

On October 23, 2012, the film's NC-17 rating was surrendered. It was released in the United States on DVD and Blu-ray unedited, as an unrated director's cut. An R-rated version also was released on DVD. The chicken leg scene was heavily censored, and the beating of Chris during the film's climax was substantially cut, in order to garner the more marketable R rating.

Release
Killer Joe premiered at the 68th Venice International Film Festival before making its North American debut at the 2011 Toronto International Film Festival, where US distribution rights were acquired by LD Entertainment. LD Entertainment, Liddell's new theatrical distribution company headed by David Dinerstein, scheduled its release for July 2012.

The film made its Quebec premiere at the Fantasia Festival, an annual international genre film festival held in Montreal, Quebec, on July 31, 2012.

The film's UK premiere was at the Opening Gala of the Edinburgh International Film Festival on June 20, 2012, where it was introduced by Friedkin and Gershon, who later attended the after-party at the National Museum of Scotland. The film received a theatrical release in the United Kingdom on June 29. It opened in three theaters almost a month later (July 27) in the United States.

Box office
The film was not a box office success, only grossing $1,987,762 in the domestic market and $2,645,906 internationally for a worldwide total of $4,633,668. The film was only released in 75 theaters nationwide and closed on October 14, nine days prior to the rating being surrendered.

Critical reception
Killer Joe has a rating of 80% on Rotten Tomatoes, based on 172 reviews, and an average rating of 6.7/10. The critics consensus on the website states: "Violent, darkly comic, and full of strong performances, Killer Joe proves William Friedkin hasn't lost his touch, even if the plot may be too lurid for some." The film also has an average score of 62 out of 100 on Metacritic, based on 38 reviews, indicating "generally favorable reviews".

According to Justin Chang of Variety, "Killer Joe was Letts' first play, written more than a decade before his smash hit August: Osage County, and the text's sneer of condescension toward its panoply of trailer-trash caricatures has not entirely abated here," yet "the film doesn't belabor even its cheaper punchlines, and the fleet, kinetic visual style devised by d.p. Caleb Deschanel and editor Darrin Navarro emphasizes narrative momentum over cruel comedy. To be sure, Friedkin is clearly amused and appalled by his slovenly, foul-mouthed characters, with their off-the-charts levels of dysfunction and incompetence. But he directs them vigorously enough, pushing them past the realm of caricature to individuate themselves onscreen."

The Daily Telegraph said Church, Gershon, and Hirsch portray a "uniformly gormless family unit" in a film whose "positively Jacobean climax [earns] its 18 certificate and then some."

Keith Uhlich of Time Out New York named Killer Joe the fifth-best film of 2012, calling it a "thrilling black comedy."

Awards
McConaughey received an Independent Spirit Award nomination for Best Male Lead. The Women Film Critics Circle, however, nominated the film for its display of the worst female and male images.
 Winner Best Independent Film Saturn Awards
 Winner Best Actor Saturn Awards (Matthew McConaughey)
 Nominated Best Director Saturn Awards (William Friedkin)
 Nominated Best Supporting Actress Saturn Awards (Gina Gershon)
 Nominated Best Writing Saturn Awards (Tracey Letts)
 Winner Special Honorary Award Austin Film Critics Association (Matthew McConaughey)
 Nominated Grand Prix Belgian Film Critics Association
 Nominated Best Actor Independent Spirit Awards (Matthew McConaughey)
 Nominated Best Supporting Actor San Diego Film Critics Society (Matthew McConaughey)
 Winner Best Supporting Actress Toronto Film Critics Association (Gina Gershon)
 Winner Golden Mouse Venice International Film Festival (William Friedkin)
 Nominated Golden Lion Venice International Film Festival (William Friedkin)

Home media
Killer Joe was released on DVD and Blu-ray Disc December 21, 2012. The DVD features Southern Fried Hospitality: From Stage to Screen featurette, South by Southwest Q&A with the cast and intro by Friedkin, and the red-band theatrical trailer. The Blu-ray Disc includes all DVD features including the theatrically-released cut under the name the "Unrated Director's Cut" and an audio commentary by Friedkin.

TV series
On October 23, 2017, Friedkin announced that he was developing a television series based on his film, albeit without McConaughey.

References

External links
 
 
 
 
 

2011 films
2010s English-language films
2010s crime thriller films
American black comedy films 
American crime thriller films 
American independent films
2010s exploitation films
Films scored by Tyler Bates
Films about contract killing
Films about dysfunctional families
American films based on plays
Rating controversies in film
Films directed by William Friedkin
Films set in Dallas
Films shot in New Orleans
Juvenile sexuality in films
Southern Gothic films
Worldview Entertainment films
Voltage Pictures films
2011 black comedy films
2011 independent films
2010s American films